Emelie Wikström (born 2 October 1992) is a Swedish former World Cup alpine ski racer.

Wikström made her World Cup debut March 2009 in Garmisch Partenkirchen, Germany. Her best result in World Cup was a 4th place in slalom from 2012. She participated at the 2011 World Ski Championships, where she achieved a 24th place in slalom.

Wikström represented Sweden at the 2014 Winter Olympics in slalom where she finished 6th.

Olympic results

World Championship results

References

External links
 
 
 

1992 births
Living people
Swedish female alpine skiers
Olympic alpine skiers of Sweden
Alpine skiers at the 2014 Winter Olympics
Alpine skiers at the 2018 Winter Olympics
21st-century Swedish women